Claudia Zanella (born 30 March 1979) is an Italian actress. She appeared in more than twenty films since 2004. On 19 July 2014 she married film director Fausto Brizzi.

Selected filmography

References

External links 

1979 births
Living people
Italian film actresses
Actors from Florence